The Odd Couple is a television situation comedy broadcast from September 24, 1970 to March 7, 1975 on ABC. It starred Jack Klugman as Oscar Madison and Tony Randall as Felix Unger. The following is a list of episodes.

Series overview
All five seasons of this show have been released on DVD by Paramount Home Entertainment/CBS DVD.

Episodes

Season 1 (1970–71)

Season 2 (1971–72)

Season 3 (1972–73)

Season 4 (1973–74)

Season 5 (1974–75)

TV movie (1993)

References

External links
 
 

Lists of American sitcom episodes
The Odd Couple